Kibzaim, or Cibsaim in the Douai-Rheims translation of the Hebrew Bible, (word 6911 in Strong's Concordance, meaning "two heaps" from the Hebrew word qabats, to gather, collect) was a Levitical city of Ephraim, assigned to the Kohathite Levites.

It was also called Jokmeam, but in the Book of Joshua, 'Jokneam' was one of the cities of Naphtali given to the Merarites.

Levitical cities
Tribe of Ephraim